Shirley Booth (born Marjory Ford; August 30, 1898October 16, 1992) was an American actress. One of only 24 performers to achieve the Triple Crown of Acting, Booth was the recipient of an Academy Award, two Primetime Emmy Awards and three Tony Awards.

Primarily a theater actress, Booth began her career on Broadway in 1925. Her most significant success was as Lola Delaney, in the drama Come Back, Little Sheba, for which she received her second Tony Award in 1950 (she would go on to win three). She made her film debut, reprising her role in the 1952 film version, for which she won the Academy Award for Best Actress and the Golden Globe Award for Best Actress for her performance. Despite her successful entry into films, she preferred acting on the stage, and made only four more films.

From 1961 to 1966, she played the title role in the sitcom Hazel, for which she won two Primetime Emmy Awards. She was later acclaimed for her performance in the 1966 television production of The Glass Menagerie. Her final role was providing the voice of Mrs. Claus in the 1974 animated Christmas television special The Year Without a Santa Claus.

Early life
Booth was born in New York City to Albert James and Virginia M. (née Wright) Ford. In the 1905 New York state census, she was listed as Thelma Booth Ford. She had one sibling, a younger sister, Jean (1914-2010). Her early childhood was spent in Flatbush, Brooklyn, where she attended Public School 152.

When she was seven, Booth's family moved to Philadelphia where she first became interested in acting after seeing a stage performance. When Booth was a teenager, her family moved to Hartford, Connecticut, where she became involved in summer stock. She made her stage debut in a production of Mother Carey's Chickens. Against her father's protests, she dropped out of school and traveled to New York City to further pursue a career. She initially used the name "Thelma Booth" when her father forbade her to use the family name professionally. She eventually changed her name to Shirley Booth.

Career

Booth began her career onstage as a teenager, acting in stock company productions. She was a prominent actress in Pittsburgh theatre for a time, performing with the Sharp Company. Her debut on Broadway was in the play, Hell's Bells, opposite Humphrey Bogart on January 26, 1925. Booth first attracted major notice as the female lead in the comedy hit Three Men on a Horse, which ran almost two years from 1935 to 1937. During the 1930s and 1940s, she achieved popularity in dramas, comedies and, later, musicals. She acted with Katharine Hepburn in The Philadelphia Story (1939), originated the role of Ruth Sherwood in the 1940 Broadway production of My Sister Eileen, and performed with Ralph Bellamy in Tomorrow the World (1943).
Booth also starred on the popular radio series Duffy's Tavern, playing the lighthearted, wisecracking, man-crazy daughter of the unseen tavern owner on CBS radio from 1941 to 1942 and on NBC Blue from 1942 to 1943. Her then-husband, Ed Gardner, created and wrote the show, as well as played its lead character, Archie, the malapropping manager of the tavern; Booth left the show not long after the couple divorced. She auditioned unsuccessfully for the title role of Our Miss Brooks in 1948; she had been recommended by Harry Ackerman, who was to produce the show, but Ackerman told radio historian Gerald Nachman that he felt Booth was too conscious of a high school teacher's struggles to have full fun with the character's comic possibilities. Our Miss Brooks became a radio and television hit when the title role went to Eve Arden.

Booth received her first Tony Award, for Best Supporting or Featured Actress (Dramatic), for her performance as Grace Woods in Goodbye, My Fancy (1948). Her second Tony was for Best Actress in a Play, which she received for her widely acclaimed performance as the tortured wife Lola Delaney in the poignant drama Come Back, Little Sheba (1950). Her leading man, Sidney Blackmer, received the Tony for Best Actor in a Play for his performance as her husband, Doc.

Her success in Come Back, Little Sheba was immediately followed by the musical A Tree Grows in Brooklyn (1951), based on the popular novel, in which she played the feisty, but lovable Aunt Sissy, which proved to be another major hit. Her popularity was such that, at the time, the story was skewed from the original so that Aunt Sissy was the leading role (rather than Francie). Booth then went to Hollywood and reprised her stage role in the 1952 film version of Come Back, Little Sheba with Burt Lancaster playing Doc. After that movie was completed — her first of only five films in her career — she returned to New York and played Leona Samish in The Time of the Cuckoo (1952) on Broadway.

In 1953, Booth received the Academy Award for Best Actress in a Leading Role for her performance in Come Back, Little Sheba, becoming the first actress ever to win both a Tony and an Oscar for the same role. The film also earned Booth Best Actress awards from The Cannes Film Festival, the Golden Globe Awards, The New York Film Critics Circle Awards, and National Board of Review. She also received her third Tony, her second in the Best Actress in a Play category, for her performance in the Broadway production of Arthur Laurents' play The Time of the Cuckoo.

Booth was 54 years old when she made her first movie, although she had successfully shaved almost a decade off her real age, with her publicity stating 1907 as the year of her birth. Her correct year of birth was known by only her closest associates until her correct year of birth, 1898, was announced at the time of her death. Her second starring film, a romantic drama About Mrs. Leslie opposite Robert Ryan, was released in 1954 to good reviews, but was poorly received by audiences. In 1953, Booth had made a cameo appearance as herself in the all-star comedy/drama movie Main Street to Broadway. She spent the next few years commuting between New York and California. On Broadway, she scored personal successes in the musical By the Beautiful Sea (1954) and the comedy Desk Set (1955). Although Booth had become well known to moviegoers during this period, the movie roles for The Time of the Cuckoo (re-titled as Summertime for the film in 1955), and Desk Set (1957), both went to Katharine Hepburn.

In 1957, Booth won the Sarah Siddons Award for her work on the stage in Chicago. She returned to the Broadway stage in 1959, starring as the long-suffering title character in Marc Blitzstein's musical Juno, an adaptation of Seán O'Casey's 1924 classic play, Juno and the Paycock. In 1961, director Frank Capra approached Booth about starring in Pocketful of Miracles, an updated version of Capra's 1933 comedy-drama Lady for a Day starring May Robson. Booth informed him that she was unable to match Robson's Oscar-nominated performance in the original film and declined the role. Capra instead cast Bette Davis, who was unfavorably compared to Robson by most reviewers when the film was released.

Booth returned to motion pictures to star in two more films for Paramount Pictures, playing Dolly Gallagher Levi in the 1958 film adaptation of Thornton Wilder's romance/comedy The Matchmaker (the source text for the musical Hello, Dolly!), and to play Alma Duval in the drama Hot Spell (1958). For her performances in both films, Booth was nominated as the year's Best Actress by the New York Film Critics Circle (Susan Hayward won for her portrayal of executed murderer Barbara Graham in I Want to Live!).

Hazel

In 1961, Booth was cast in the title role on the NBC situation comedy Hazel, based on Ted Key's popular single-panel cartoon from the Saturday Evening Post about the domineering yet endearing housemaid named Hazel Burke who works for the Baxter family. The series also starred Don DeFore as George Baxter, Whitney Blake as Dorothy "Missy" Baxter, and Bobby Buntrock as the Baxters' young son Harold (whom Hazel called "Sport"). Upon its premiere, Hazel was an immediate hit with audiences and drew high ratings.

In 1963, Booth told the Associated Press, at the height of Hazel'''s popularity,
I liked playing Hazel the first time I read one of the scripts, and I could see all the possibilities of the character—the comedy would take care of itself. My job was to give her heart. Hazel never bores me. Besides, she's my insurance policy.
Over the course of its five-year run, Booth won two Primetime Emmy Awards for her work in the series and was nominated for a third. Booth is one of the few performers to win all three major entertainment awards (Oscar, Tony, Emmy).

In 1965, NBC canceled the series. CBS picked up and retooled the series; Don DeFore (George Baxter) and Whitney Blake (Dorothy Baxter) were written out of the series, while Bobby Buntrock (Harold "Sport" Baxter) remained a cast member. Ray Fulmer was cast as Steve Baxter, the brother of DeFore's character George. Booth, who owned the rights to the series, hired Lynn Borden, a former Miss Arizona, as Steve's wife Barbara. Julia Benjamin was cast as Barbara and Steve's daughter, Susie. In the retooled version, George and Dorothy Baxter have moved to Baghdad leaving Harold to live with Steve and Barbara. Hazel remains on as the new Baxters' housekeeper. While ratings for the fifth season were still strong (Hazel ranked number 26 for the season), Booth decided to end the show due to health issues.

Later career and retirement
Shortly after the end of Hazel, Booth appeared in the television production of The Glass Menagerie that aired on the anthology series CBS Playhouse. She won critical acclaim for her performance and was nominated for another Primetime Emmy Award.

Booth's final Broadway appearances were in a revival of Noël Coward's play Hay Fever and the musical Look to the Lilies, both in 1970. In 1971, she returned to Chicago to star opposite Gig Young in a revival of Harvey at the Blackstone Theater. In 1973, Booth returned to episodic television in the ABC series A Touch of Grace. The series was based on the British sitcom For the Love of Ada. A Touch of Grace was canceled after one season.

In 1974, Booth provided the voice for the character of Mrs. Claus in the animated television special The Year Without a Santa Claus. It was Booth's final acting role after which she retired to her home in Cape Cod.

Personal life
On November 23, 1929, Booth married Ed Gardner, who later gained fame as the creator and host of the radio series Duffy's Tavern''. They divorced in 1942. She married William H. Baker Jr., a corporal in the U.S. Army, the following year. Booth and Baker remained married until his death from heart disease in 1951. She never remarried and had no children from either marriage.

For her contributions to the film industry, Booth has a motion pictures star on the Hollywood Walk of Fame at 6850 Hollywood Boulevard.

After retiring from acting in 1974, Booth moved to North Chatham, Massachusetts, where she lived with her pet poodle and two cats. She maintained contact with her friends via telephone and spent her time painting and doing needlework. In November 1979, she was inducted into the American Theatre Hall of Fame. Booth did not attend the ceremony and the award was accepted on her behalf by Celeste Holm.

Death
By the 1980s, Booth's health began to decline. She reportedly suffered a stroke that caused mobility issues and blindness. After her death, Booth's sister said she had broken her hip in 1991, which further inhibited her mobility. On October 16, 1992, 
Booth died at the age of 94 at her home in North Chatham. After a private memorial service, Booth was interred in the Baker family plot in Mount Hebron Cemetery in Montclair, New Jersey.

Film & honors

Television & honors

Theatre & honors

See also

 List of actors with Academy Award nominations

Bibliography

References

External links

 
 
 
 Shirley Booth infosite 
 Historic film footage of Booth at the American Theatre Wing Merchant Seaman's Club, New York, during World War II, criticalpast.com; accessed May 18, 2014.

1898 births
1992 deaths
20th-century American actresses
Actresses from New York City
American film actresses
American musical theatre actresses
American radio actresses
American radio personalities
American stage actresses
American television actresses
Best Actress Academy Award winners
Best Drama Actress Golden Globe (film) winners
Donaldson Award winners
Outstanding Performance by a Lead Actress in a Comedy Series Primetime Emmy Award winners
Tony Award winners
Burials at Mount Hebron Cemetery (Montclair, New Jersey)
Paramount Pictures contract players
People from Flatbush, Brooklyn
20th-century American singers
20th-century American women singers